Ishiwatari is a Japanese surname. Notable people with the surname include:

Daisuke Ishiwatari (born 1973), African-Japanese video game developer, illustrator, musician, composer and voice actor
, Japanese actor
Junji Ishiwatari (born 1977), Japanese musician, and former guitarist and songwriter for the Japanese rock band Supercar
Koto Ishiwatari (1874–1947), Japanese nurse

Japanese-language surnames